George Washington School may refer to:

George Washington School (Elmira, New York), listed on the National Register of Historic Places in Chemung County, New York
George Washington School (now housing Vare-Washington School), National Register of Historic Places listings in Philadelphia
George Washington School (Kingsport, Tennessee), listed on the National Register of Historic Places in Sullivan County, Tennessee
Colegio Jorge Washington, in Cartagena, Colombia

See also
 George Washington High School (disambiguation)
 George Washington Middle School (disambiguation)
 George Washington Elementary School (disambiguation)